Foloi (Latin: Pholoe) is a village and a former municipality in Elis, West Greece, Greece. Since the 2011 local government reform it is part of the municipality Archaia Olympia, of which it is a municipal unit. The municipal unit has an area of 174.202 km2. The seat of the municipality was in the village Lalas, in the southern part of the municipal unit. The village Foloi is situated in the northwestern part. Foloi is situated in a mountainous, sparsely populated area. The Foloi oak forest is located in the municipal unit. Foloi is located about 15 km northeast of Olympia, 30 km east of Pyrgos and 55 km south of Patras. It borders on Arcadia to the east, across the river Erymanthus.

History

The village, formerly named Yiarmena, was renamed in 1928 after an antic name related to the centaur Pholus.

Subdivisions
The municipal unit Foloi is subdivided into the following communities (constituent villages in brackets):
Achladini (Achladini, Koutsouroumpas)
Doukas (Doukas, Lasdikas)
Foloi
Koumanis (Koumanis, Ai Giannaki, Kastania)
Lalas (Lalas, Pothos)
Milies
Nemouta (Nemouta, Kampos, Tsaparaiika, Villia)
Neraida (Neraida, Kampos)
Persaina (Nea Persaina)

Historical population

See also
List of settlements in Elis

References

External links

Birds of Mount Foloi, also in Greek
http://grenier2clio.free.fr/grec/pholoe.htm  (in French)

Populated places in Elis